Govind Nagar railway station  is located in Basti district in the Indian state of Uttar Pradesh. It serves Walterganj Market, Sugar Mill, and the surrounding Village areas. Station Code (GOVR) Northern Railway.  Here are some trains that are passing through Govindnagar railway stations like Gkp-gd Passenger, Gd-gkp Passenger, Ay-gkp Passenger, Gkp-ay Passenger, Gd-gkp Passenger, and many more.

References

Railway stations in Basti district